Spirit of Australia is a wooden speed boat built in a Sydney backyard, by Ken Warby, that broke and set the world water speed record on 8 October 1978.

The record and boat 
It was powered by a Westinghouse J34 jet engine. The engine was developed by the Westinghouse Electric Company in the late 1940s and was used for jet fighters and other aircraft. Spirit of Australia is displayed permanently at the Australian National Maritime Museum in Darling Harbour, Sydney, New South Wales.

Successors
Starting in the early 1990s, Warby built a second jet boat, Aussie Spirit powered with a fresh Westinghouse J34, but he never made a record attempt with it. Warby and his son Dave then worked on a new boat, Spirit of Australia II, powered by a Bristol Siddeley Orpheus jet engine taken from an Italian Fiat G.91 fighter. This was completed in December 2004. In 2007 Ken Warby handed over the reins to his son who achieved  on a testing run on Blowering Lake in 2018. As of 22 May 2021 the team are still modifying the design.

See also
 World Sailing Speed Record Council
 List of vehicle speed records

References

External links

 Australian National Maritime Museum

Water speed records
Ships preserved in museums
Museum ships in Australia
Australian National Maritime Museum
Jet-powered hydroplanes